Hana El Zahed (born 5 January 1994) is an Egyptian actress.

Biography
El Zahed was born in 1994. She made her acting debut in the film Al Meshakhsaty in 2003. In 2009, she starred as the granddaughter of actor Mohamed Sobhi in the TV series Yawmeyat Wanees we Ahfadoh. El Zahed subsequently took a break in her acting career. She described the beginning of her artistic career as not being planned, but came about through pure coincidence.

El Zahed resumed her acting career in the film Jimmy's Plan in 2014. Later in the year, she was cast in Tamer Hosny's TV series Farq Tawqit. In 2015, El Zahed had roles in the TV series Alf Leila wa Leila, Mawlana El-aasheq, and El Boyoot Asrar. The following year, she starred in Al Mizan. In May 2017, El Zahed starred in the TV series Fel La La Land, written by Mustafa Saqr and directed by Ahmed el-Gendy. The series became one of Egypt's most watched on YouTube. She also had a role in the play Ahlan Ramadan. In 2018, El Zahed starred in the film Sons of Adam.

In February 2019, El Zahed played Gamila in the film Love Story. She starred in the TV series El wad sayed el shahat in May, alongside her fiancé Ahmed Fahmy. El Zahed married Fahmy on 11 September 2019 in a lavish ceremony, with Mohamed Hamaki performing his songs. During her honeymoon, she was hospitalized with a stomach virus in Singapore. In 2020, El Zahed starred in the comedy-fantasy film The Washing Machine alongside Mahmoud Hemida. It was directed by Essam Abdel Hamid and takes place in the future. The filming received criticism for taking place amidst the COVID-19 pandemic. In July 2020, she was verbally harassed by men in a truck while driving outside Cairo.

Filmography
Films
 2003 : Al Meshakhsaty
 2014 : Jimmy's Plan
 2018 : Sons of Adam 
 2019 : Love Story 
 2020 : The Washing Machine
 2022 : Ba7ebak with her sister Farah El Zahed

Television
 2009 : Yawmeyat Wanees we Ahfadoh
 2014 : Farq Tawqit
 2015 : Mawlana El-aasheq
 2015 : Alf Leila wa Leila
 2015 : El Boyoot Asrar
 2016 : Mamoun we shoraka
 2016 : Al Mizan 
 2017 : Fel La La Land
 2018 : Sok ala Khwatak
 2019 : El wad sayed el shahat

See also  
Talaat Zakaria

References

External links
Hana El Zahed at the Internet Movie Database
 
 

1994 births
Living people
21st-century Egyptian actresses
Egyptian film actresses
Egyptian television actresses
Egyptian stage actresses
Actresses from Cairo